A Plot and No Plot is a 1697 comedy play by the English writer John Dennis.

The original Drury Lane cast included Thomas Doggett as Bull senior, Colley Cibber as Bull junior, William Pinkethman as Baldernoe, Joseph Haines as Rumour, William Bullock as Frowzy, Jane Rogers as Sylvia and Mary Kent as Friskit.

References

Bibliography
 Lowerre, Kathryn. Music and Musicians on the London Stage, 1695-1705. Routledge, 2017.
 Van Lennep, W. The London Stage, 1660-1800: Volume One, 1660-1700. Southern Illinois University Press, 1960 .
 Watson, George. The New Cambridge Bibliography of English Literature: Volume 2, 1660-1800. Cambridge University Press, 1971.

1697 plays
English plays
West End plays
Comedy plays
Plays by John Dennis